Kouko Djédjé Hilaire Guehi (born 27 December 1982) is an Ivorian former professional footballer who played as a midfielder. He spent most of his professional career in Morocco.

Career 
Born in San Pédro, Guehi played for Séwé Sport in his native Ivory Coast. He joined Moroccan club Raja CA in December 2009. On 31 January 2010, he played his first match with Raja CA at Mohamed V Stadium against Hassania Agadir.

References

External links 
 
 

1982 births
Living people
Ivorian footballers
People from San-Pédro, Ivory Coast
Association football midfielders
Séwé Sport de San-Pédro players
Raja CA players
Olympic Club de Safi players
Ivorian expatriate footballers
Ivorian expatriate sportspeople in Morocco
Expatriate footballers in Morocco
Ivory Coast A' international footballers
2009 African Nations Championship players